Aterpia corticana is a species of moth of the family Tortricidae.

Description
Moths fly from July to August.

Biology
Main host plants are Aconitum variegatum and Vaccinium vitis-idaea.

Distribution
This species can be found in Austria, Bosnia and Herzegovina, Czech Republic, France, Germany, Hungary, Italy, Macedonia, Poland, Romania, Slovakia, Slovenia and  Switzerland.

Habitat
It occurs in mountain meadows and forest edges.

Bibliography
Lempke, B. J., 1979: Does Aterpia corticana Denis Schiffermuller occur in the Netherlands? Lep, Tortricidae. Entomologische Berichten (Amsterdam

References

External links
 Lepiforum.de

Olethreutini
Moths described in 1775
Moths of Europe